Hennis is a Dutch language surname, which is a variant of Hennig, and is derived from the given name Hans or Johannes. The name may refer to:

Jeanine Hennis-Plasschaert (born 1973), Dutch politician
Peter Hennis (1802–1833), British doctor
Randy Hennis (born 1965), American baseball player
Wilhelm Hennis (1923–2012), German political scientist

Other uses
Edgar Harvey Hennis House, North Carolina

References

Dutch-language surnames